Jung Hye-sung (born Jung Eun-joo on April 29, 1991) is a South Korean actress and model.

Career
Jung began her acting career in To the Beautiful You (2012) and gained recognition through supporting roles in Love in the Moonlight (2016) and Good Manager (2017) before landing her first lead role in Oh, the Mysterious (2017).

In 2019, Jung made her big-screen debut with the romance film Mate starring opposite Shim Hee-sub.

In August 2022, Jung ended her contract with J-Wide Company and decided not to renew it.

Filmography

Film

Television series

Web series

Television shows

Web shows

Music videos

Modelling

Awards and nominations

References 

1991 births
Living people
People from Busan
South Korean actresses
South Korean television actresses